The 2020–21 Army Black Knights men's ice hockey season was the 118th season of play for the program, the 111th at the Division I level, and the 18th season in the Atlantic Hockey conference. The Black Knights represented the United States Military Academy in the 2020–21 NCAA Division I men's ice hockey season and were coached by Brian Riley, in his 17th season.

Departures

Recruiting

Roster
As of October 17, 2020.

Standings

Schedule and results

|-
!colspan=12 style=";" | Regular Season

|-
!colspan=12 style=";" |

Scoring statistics

Source:

Goaltending statistics
Statistics through March 14, 2021.

Rankings

USCHO did not release a poll in week 20.

Awards and honors

References

Army Black Knights men's ice hockey seasons
Army Black Knights
Army Black Knights
Army Black Knights
Army Black Knights men's ice hockey
Army Black Knights men's ice hockey